= Imagenation =

New York organization

Imagenation is an organization based in Harlem, New York. The organization was founded in the late 1990s by Moikgantsi Kgama. Moikgantsi Kgama has been involved in the promotion of independent movies and documentaries which share the theme of the African Diaspora. In October 2005 of Essence Magazine, Moikgantsi Kgama was named one of the top 25 women who were shaping the world.

The organization hosts two events:

- Imagenation Film Festival
- Imagenation Revolution Awards
